Farm to Market Road 1 (FM 1) is a Farm to Market Road (a state-maintained road connecting rural and agricultural areas to market towns) in the U.S. state of Texas, maintained by the Texas Department of Transportation (TxDOT). FM 1 was the first such to be designated in Texas. This  road provides access from rural areas of East Texas to U.S. Highway 96 (US 96).

History
FM 1 was designated on April 23, 1941,  and was the first Farm to Market Road to be so designated in Texas. Connecting a sawmill owned by Temple Lumber Company to US 96 and obviating the need to use the Pendelton Ferry, it had been designated shortly after being upgraded from a dirt road to a paved road at the request of Temple and two gas companies. Throughout its history, the road has predominantly served the logging industry.

FM 1 ran from Pineland northward to Magasco from its inception in 1941 to October 13, 1954, when it was rerouted to end at Texas State Highway 184 (SH 184). Its old route became a spur connection to Magasco, signed as Farm to Market Road 1 Spur (FM 1 Spur). FM 1776 was also cancelled and combined with FM 1.

Route description

FM 1 begins in southwestern Sabine County near Pineland at a junction with US 96.  In Pineland, FM 1 is known as Temple Avenue and travels eastward and then northward through the town. North of Pineland, the road's name changes to Magasco Drive as it travels northward to the town of Magasco. Just south of Magasco, FM 1 Spur diverges from the main route and travels on the west side of the BNSF Railway tracks, while FM 1 crosses the tracks and runs to the east of them.

FM 1 continues northward through Sabine County and then turns to a more northwesterly route after its junction with FM 2024. FM 1 is known as North Temple Road as it enters the town of Bronson. A short break occurs in the road as it intersects SH 184 in Bronson. FM 1 resumes at a point farther north on SH 184 and heads north as Bronson Road.

FM 1 heads north from Bronson until it intersects with SH 103 west of Rosevine.  At this point another break in the road occurs.  FM 1 begins again at a point farther east along SH 103. The road heads to the northeast and is known as Rosevine Road. The road changes course to the north-northwest after a junction with FM 1592. FM 1 leaves Sabine County northwest of Rosevine and enters the northeastern portion of San Augustine County. FM 1 continues north until it terminates at SH 21 at Fords Corner.

Major intersections

References

External links
Photos of FM 1

0001
Transportation in Sabine County, Texas
Transportation in San Augustine County, Texas